Elwick is the name of the following places:

In the United Kingdom:
Elwick, County Durham, a village and civil parish
Elwick, Northumberland, a village
Elwick, Orkney (Norse: Ellidarvik)
Elwick Bay, on the south coast of Shapinsay, one of the Orkney Islands

In Australia:
Electoral division of Elwick, Tasmania
Elwick, an area of Glenorchy, Tasmania, a suburb of Hobart
Elwick Road, a major arterial road